Stinking Pond Hollow is a stream valley in eastern Oregon County in the U.S. state of Missouri. The stream is a tributary to the Eleven Point River.

Stinking Pond Hollow was so named because a pond it contained frequently was the source of a naturally occurring foul odor.

See also
Stinking Creek (Pomme de Terre River) (in Missouri)

References

Valleys of Oregon County, Missouri
Valleys of Missouri